is a railway station on the Dosan Line in Nakatosa, Takaoka District, Kōchi Prefecture, Japan. It is operated by JR Shikoku and has the station number "K22".

Lines

In addition to the local trains of the Dosan Line, the following limited express services also stop at Tosa-Kure Station:

Layout
The station consists of an island platform serving two tracks. A station building, which is located at a lower level than the tracks, houses a waiting room. The island platform is accessed by means of a ramp and a level crossing. There is also a passing loop and a siding which leads to a separate freight platform used for the loading of ballast.

JR Shikoku closed its ticket window at the station on 1 October 2010. Subsequently, a kan'i itaku agent reopened the window and continued selling tickets from a JR Shikoku POS machine.

Adjacent stations

History
At the time it was opened, the station was operated by Japanese Government Railways, later becoming Japanese National Railways (JNR). With the privatization of JNR on 1 April 1987, control of the station passed to JR Shikoku.

See also
 List of railway stations in Japan

References

Railway stations in Kōchi Prefecture
Railway stations in Japan opened in 1939